"That Girl" is a song by Canadian singer-songwriter Esthero. It was planned to be album second CD-single from her debut album Breath from Another. However record company declined to release song as a single after disappointing sales of the album, although its video picked up Canadian airplay.Song received positive reviews from critics who called it "brass-tinged" and compared to songs by smooth jazz group Swing Out Sister.

Music video 
Despite no official release of the single, a music video for the song was released in June 1999 and received airplay on Canadian and American TV. The music video for the song was filmed on 17–18 April 1999 in Toronto and directed by Patrick Hoelck.

Synopsis
The music video features Esthero as an alien living in a sealed glass room in the middle of a busy street presumably because she can't breathe air outside. She's occasionally visited by a young man she's attracted to (played by Tony Ward) and after dreaming about following him around the city in regular clothing, she decides to leave the room, wearing a clear plastic spacesuit for protection. She then walks to a restaurant where she sees the young man chatting with another girl and takes the suit off. After passing out off-screen, she wakes in the glass room with her love interest looking at her and smiling before she smiles back.

Accolades
The music video was nominated for "Cinematography of the Year" at the 1998 MuchMusic Video Awards, ultimately losing to "Release" by The Tea Party.

Use in media 
The track was featured in the movie I Still Know What You Did Last Summer.

Track listing 
Promo
"That Girl" (radio version) - 3:58
"That Girl" (album version) - 4:41

References 

1999 singles
Esthero songs
Songs written by Doc McKinney
1998 songs
Soul jazz songs
Songs written by Esthero